McLaren's Negatives is a 2006 short animated documentary directed by French Canadian filmmaker Marie-Josée Saint-Pierre. The film is a study of the Canadian animator Norman McLaren, and his personal view of film making. The short film won several awards, including the 2007 Jutra Award for best animated short film.

Cast

Awards
JUTRA for Best Animated Film 2007 (Québec)
Sterling Short Honorable Mention, Silverdocs 2006 (USA)
Best Debut Film, Animation, Message to Man International Film Festival 2006 (Russia)
Best Short Contemporary Film, Sapporo International Shortfest 2006 (Japan)
Bar in Gold, Festival Der Nationen 2006 (Austria)
Best Short Documentary Film, Animation Block Party New York 2006 (USA)
Best Animation Film, Dokufest 2006 (Kosovo)
Best International Documentary, Santiago International Short Film Festival 2006 (Chile)
Best Director Animation, Monstramundo 2006 (Brazil)
Best Script Animation, Monstramundo 2006 (Brazil)
Youth Jury Award for Most Inspirational Short Film, Real 2 Real International Film Festival for Youth 2007 (Canada)
First Prize in the Documentary Section, 10 Mostra Internacional de Curtmetratges de Sagunt 2007 (Spain)
Best Documentary, PA Film Institute Festival 2007 (USA)
Platinum Remi, Best Animation, Worldfest Houston 2007 (USA)
Special Jury Prize, Outstanding Direction Documentary, Indianapolis Film Festival 2007 (USA)
Best Documentary, Arizona International Film Festival 2007 (USA)
Special Jury Award for Best Animated Film, Ismailia International Film Festival 2007 (Egypt)
Best Documentary, FILMETS Badalona Festival 2007 (Spain)
Honorable Mention, Best Short International Film, Festival International de Curtas de Belo Horizonte 2006 (Brazil)
Honorable Mention, International Animation Competition, Monterrey International Festival 2006 (Mexico)
Special Mention Animation, Seddicorto International Festival 2006 (Italia)
Special Mention Animation, Luciana Film Festival 2006 (Italia)

See also
Ryan

References

External links
 
 

Canadian short documentary films
Documentary films about film directors and producers
Documentary films about animation
Quebec films
Canadian animated documentary films
Canadian animated short films
2006 films
2006 short documentary films
Documentary films about the cinema of Canada
2000s animated short films
2000s English-language films
2000s Canadian films
Best Animated Short Film Jutra and Iris Award winners